ABC Weekend Special is a weekly 30-minute American television anthology series for children that aired Saturday mornings on ABC from 1977 to 1997, which featured a wide variety of stories that were both live-action and animated. Similar to both ABC Afterschool Special and The ABC Saturday Superstar Movie, the ABC Weekend Special differed in that it was primarily aimed at younger viewers following ABC's Saturday-morning cartoon lineup, whereas the ABC Afterschool Special was known for its somewhat more serious, and often dramatic, storylines dealing with issues concerning a slightly older teen and pre-teen audience. The main focus of ABC Weekend Special was to encourage children to read.

With the debut of the ABC Weekend Special, some of the early ABC Afterschool Specials that had been targeted towards younger viewers were subsequently repackaged and re-run instead as ABC Weekend Specials.

Presenters/Hosts
1979–1981: Michael Young served as host of the series for two seasons.

1981–1984: Willie Tyler and his dummy Lester took over as the new hosts of the series, appearing in an opening segment introducing that week's episode as well as an ending segment wrapping up the show and often recommending the book that that week's episode had been based on.

1984–1989: The puppet character Cap'n O. G. Readmore took over as host of the series, along with Jon "Bowzer" Bauman, and/or other celebrity guest co-hosts.  The character also starred in five animated episodes of the show, as well appearing in animated Saturday morning PSAs encouraging children to "read more".

Title sequence
During the series' tenure on Saturday Mornings, ABC Weekend Specials had three main opening title sequence packages, all of which included storybook/literary elements and characters in varying forms.

List of episodes
Listed by original airdate; however, many of the episodes were put into heavy rotation, continuing to air in reruns for years after their original airdate.

Short Story Specials (1977)

Four episodes:

Season 1 (1977–1978)
14 episodes:

Season 2 (1978–1979)
12 episodes:

Season 3 (1979–1980)
12 episodes:

Season 4 (1980–1981)
Eight episodes:

Season 5 (1981–1982)
Six episodes:

Season 6 (1983)
Nine episodes:

Season 7 (1984)
Nine episodes:

Season 8 (1984–1985)
Eight episodes:

Season 9 (1985)
Nine episodes:

Season 10 (1986)
Nine episodes:

Season 11 (1988)
Four episodes:

Season 12 (1988–1989)
Five episodes:

Season 13 (1991)
Three episodes:

Season 14 (1992)
Three episodes:

Season 15 (1992–1993)
Eight episodes:

Season 16 (1993–1994)
Three episodes:

Season 17 (1994–1996)
Six episodes:

Other specials
Occasionally, during the Weekend Specials timeslot, ABC aired a series of specials under the title ABC Saturday Morning Specials. Two ABC's Wide World of Sports for Kids specials were also produced in 1994.

List of other specials

References

External links

 
1977 American television series debuts
1997 American television series endings
1970s American anthology television series
1980s American anthology television series
1990s American anthology television series
1970s American children's television series
1980s American children's television series
1990s American children's television series
Weekend Special
English-language television shows
American television series with live action and animation
American television shows featuring puppetry
Television series by 20th Century Fox Television
Television series by Disney